The Trans-Am Series, Rolex Sports Car Series, and American Le Mans Series have all held races in the Miami area.

IMSA
Promoter Ralph Sanchez brought auto racing to the Miami area in 1983. A course at Bicentennial Park featured the IMSA GT Championship and the inaugural Grand Prix of Miami. A  circuit was laid out on the park roads and Biscayne Boulevard. The 1983 event was a failure both competitively and financially. A severe rainstorm flooded the circuit, and stopped the race after less than one-sixth of the distance was completed. Despite not being obligated to, Sanchez decided to pay the entire purse to the competitors, absorbing a $1.3 million loss but earning great respect from the racing fraternity.

A year later, the event returned, and grew into a huge success.

IMSA races were held at the first Bicentennial Park from 1983 until 1985. In 1986, the event moved to a new layout, also located at Bicentennial Park. The new Bicentennial Park circuit was a semi-permanent layout that featured purpose-built roads in the park area, along with a temporary segment taking it out on Biscayne Boulevard near the entrance to the Port of Miami. The event continued through 1993, at which time IMSA itself was experiencing a period of decline and reorganization.

1983: Race red-flagged after 27 laps due to heavy rain.

Trans Am
For 1994, the event at Bicentennial Park switched to the SCCA Trans-Am Series. This event lasted only one year. In 1995, the CART series utilized the course for one race, then the course was partially razed for the construction of American Airlines Arena.

American Le Mans Series
The ALMS and Champ Car held a joint race on a new circuit at Bayfront Park. The event took place in 2002 and 2003.

For 2002, a  circuit utilized park roads and extended onto Biscayne Boulevard and 3rd and 4th Streets. In 2003, the layout was changed to drop the 3rd/4th Street loop and add a section on Biscayne Boulevard along the north end of the park.

Grand Am
The Rolex Sports Car Series held a race at Homestead-Miami Speedway in Homestead, Florida. The event was first held in 1998 as a part of the United States Road Racing Championship, but following the cancelation of that series the FIA GT Championship took over the 1999 event.  Grand-Am revived the event in 2000. The race took place on the combined road course layout.

For 2002-2009, the race was held in conjunction with the Indycar race. In 2009, it moved to October and served as the Grand Am season finale. In 2010, the Indycar race was dropped, and the Grand Am race returned to the spring as a stand-alone event. It was not scheduled for 2013.

The 1998 race was a part of the United States Road Racing Championship. No race was held in 1999.

See also
Grand Prix of Miami (open wheel racing)

References

External links
World Sports Racing Prototypes: IMSA archive
Racing Sports Cars: Miami archive
Ultimate Racing History: Miami archive
Ultimate Racing History: Bayfront Park archive
Racing Sports Cars: Homestead archive
Ultimate Racing History: Homestead archive

IMSA GT Championship races
Motorsport competitions in Florida
Recurring events disestablished in 1993
Recurring sporting events established in 1983
Motorsport in Miami
Grand-Am races
Homestead, Florida
1983 establishments in Florida